Ornostay Bluff is a volcanic bluff in northern British Columbia, Canada, located just southwest of Mount Edziza in Mount Edziza Provincial Park and southeast of Telegraph Creek.

See also
List of volcanoes in Canada
Volcanism of Canada
Volcanism of Western Canada

References

Mountains of British Columbia
Mount Edziza volcanic complex
Pleistocene volcanism